Blough may refer to:

Places
Blough, Pennsylvania, a community in Somerset County, Pennsylvania

People with the surname
Carman George Blough (1895–1981), American accountant 
David Blough (born 1995), American football player
Roger Blough (1904-1985), the former chairman and chief executive of the United States Steel Corporation